Špela Dragaš (born 14 April 1970) is a Slovenian rhythmic gymnastics coach, Italian citizen since 2009.

Since 1999 she has been technical manager of the rhythmic gymnastics competitive section of Associazione Sportiva Udinese, as well as coach of the Italian national rhythmic gymnasts Tara Dragas, Alexandra Agiurgiuculese, Isabelle Tavano and Alice Del Frate, who was also a competitor dancer in the talent show Amici di Maria De Filippi. For the four-year Olympic period 2017-2020 she also hold the role of first level FIG international judge for Slovenia.

Personal life 
In 1997 she graduated from the Faculty of Sociology, Political Science and Journalism of the University of Ljubljana. In 2001 she married the singer and actor Sasha Dragas with whom she had two children: Marko and Tara Dragas.

Career

Trainer 
Špela approached the teaching of rhythmic gymnastics thanks to her mother, also a coach of this discipline, obtaining the specialization and the patent as a first, second and third level trainer at the FIG Academy in Lausanne.

From 1992 to 1997 she coached Športna Zveza Vrhnika, the sports club of her hometown Vrhnika, following the training of gymnasts of national interest, including Ana Stumberger (World Championships 1992), Sandra Zilavec (World Championships 1993) and Dusica Jeremic (European Championships 1995 and World Championships 1997).

In 1996 she was responsible for the Slovenian junior team at the European Championships in Asker, Norway.

In 1998 she became the technical director of the Siska sports club in Ljubljana, where she followed the preparation for the European Championships in Porto of the individual gymnasts of the Slovenian national team Dusica Jeremic, Tina Cas and Mojca Rode.

In 1999 she is responsible for the senior national team of Slovenia, which participates in the European Championships in Budapest, conquering a historic final with 10 clubs. She then moved to Italy in Udine where she began her collaboration with Associazione Sportiva Udinese, holding the role of technical director leading, over the years, the club to compete in the most important national championships.

In 2009, following the acquisition of citizenship, she obtained the federal coach patent issued by Federginnastica.

In 2014 she led ASU to victory in the Serie A2 Rhythmic Gymnastics Championship and promotion to the Serie A1 Championship, in which they still currently compete.

Since 2010 she had been the trainer of the gymnast, of Romanian origin, Alexandra Agiurgiuculese, who following her parents' transfer to Italy began training at ASU obtaining over time numerous titles at national, European and World Championships.

In 2016 Alexandra won two bronze and two silver medals at the European Championships in Holon.

Thanks to the results obtained by the section she led, in 2017 the Italian Gymnastics Federation awarded ASU the title of National Technical Center.

In 2018 Alexandra won the bronze medal with ball and in teams, at the World Championships in Sofia. 

At the 2019 World Championships in Baku, Agiurgiuculese obtained a 6th place all around and qualified for the 2020 Olympics.

In August 2021 she participates in the Tokyo 2020 Olympic Games as Agiurgiuculese's coach.

After Alexandra departure from the club in late 2021 Špela is now focusing on coaching new talents at ASU, including her daughter Tara who won silver at the 2022 European Championships.

Judge 
Since 1993 she has been an international FIG judge for Slovenia. She participated as a judgeat the Olympic Games in Athens 2004, London 2012, Rio 2016. Se also judgedd in the editions of the World Championships in Berlin 1997, New Orleans 2002, Budapest 2003, Patras 2007, Mie 2009, Moscow 2010, Montpellier 2011, Izmir 2014, Stuttgart 2015 and Pesaro 2017; in addition to the European Championships of Prague 1995, Askar 1996, Porto 1998, Budapest 1999, Geneva 2001, Moscow 2006, Bremen 2010, Minsk 2011, Nizni-Novgorod 2012, Vienna 2013, Minsk 2015, Holon 2016 and Budapest 2017.

References

Living people
1970 births
Gymnastics coaches
Italian Slovenes